was an Edo period Japanese samurai, and the 9th daimyō  of Nihonmatsu Domain in the Tōhoku region of Japan. He was the 10th hereditary chieftain of the Niwa clan. His courtesy title was  Saikyō-no-daifu, and his Court rank was Junior Fourth Rank, Lower Grade.

Biography
Nagatomi, known in his childhood as Kakuzō (覚蔵) and later Bankichi (蕃吉), was born in the clan's Edo residence in 1803. He was the eldest son of the previous daimyō, Niwa Nagaakira by a concubine. At age 11, on the death of his father, he became  daimyō of Nihonmatsu. Due to his youth, he relied heavily on his karō,  Niwa Takaaki. He encouraged his retainers to excel in both martial and literary arts, and to that end, sponsored the opening of the han school, Keigakukan (敬学館). In 1822, he was forced to deploy domain forces to put down a peasant uprising.  He also helped revive the domain's economic situation following a seven-year string of famines during the Tenpō era. His domain, together with Aizu Domain, was placed in charge of security at the Futtsu artillery emplacement by the Tokugawa shogunate during the Perry Expedition.  Citing ill health, Nagatomi resigned his positions in 1858, and was succeeded by his sixth son Niwa Nagakuni.

Nagatomi was married to a granddaughter of Arima Yoritaka of Kurume Domain. His seventh son was adopted into the Inaba clan, becoming Inaba Masakuni, daimyō of Yodo Domain and a member of the rōjū council. His either son was likewise adopted into the Mizuno clan, becoming Mizuno Katsutomo  daimyō of Yūki Domain, while one of his daughters became the official wife of Tokugawa Yoshikatsu of Owari Domain, and another married Tokugawa Mochinaga, head of the Hitotsubashi Tokugawa

Notes

Further reading
Nihonmatsu-han shi 二本松藩史. Tokyo: Nihonmatsu-hanshi kankōkai 二本松藩史刊行会, 1926 (republished by Rekishi Toshosha 歴史図書社, 1973)
Sugeno Shigeru 菅野与. Ōshū Nihonmatsu-han nenpyō 奥州二本松藩年表. Aizu-Wakamatsu shi 会津若松市: Rekishi Shunjūsha 歴史春秋社, 2004.

External links
Genealogy of the Niwa clan of Nihonmatsu (in Japanese)
Biography of Nagatomi (in Japanese)

1803 births
1866 deaths
Niwa clan
Fudai daimyo